The Philadelphia Virtuosi Chamber Orchestra (PVCO) is a chamber orchestra in Philadelphia, Pennsylvania, founded in 1991 by Daniel Spalding.

Composed of some of the Philadelphia region’s foremost musicians, the Philadelphia Virtuosi Chamber Orchestra was founded in 1991 by music director and conductor Daniel Spalding. Under his baton, the orchestra has performed numerous concerts in Center City Philadelphia, as well as in unusual venues throughout the region designed to reach new audiences. The orchestra’s vast repertoire encompasses Baroque to Modern. Programs often include new discoveries of less known works, world premieres, arrangements written especially for the Philadelphia Virtuosi, as well as standard repertoire, sometimes performed with creative visual effects such as special lighting or stage movement. Since 1996, the Philadelphia Virtuosi has been in constant demand outside its home city and is often on the road. The orchestra has performed at New York’s Lincoln Center, Weill Hall at Carnegie Hall, Columbia University’s Miller Theater, the Getty Museum in Los Angeles, the Kravis Center in West Palm Beach, Colorado’s Vilar Center, the Bermuda Festival, and on three extensive tours to South America.  In 2010 they made their debut in Mexico and in Europe at the Nomus International Festival in Serbia. In November 2014 the orchestra toured Russia including sold out performances at Moscow’s Tchaikovsky Hall and Saint Petersburg’s Mariinsky Theater, where Mr. Spalding's pianist partner Gabriela Imreh often accompanied the orchestra in certain works. 

The Philadelphia Virtuosi Chamber Orchestra is also known for its series of recordings on Connoisseur Society, Arabesque, New World Records, New Ariel, and on Naxos.  Their recording of the music of American composer George Antheil for the Naxos American Classics Series (including the enigmatic Ballet Mecanique) was Editor’s Choice for Gramophone, chosen as CD of the week by BBC Radio 3 and the London Observer, and as one of the top 10 classical CD’s of 2001 by the Chicago Tribune. It was also a best selling album in the UK and one of Naxos, best- selling CDs in the USA. Their CD of American composer Howard Hanson, also for Naxos, received the Third Annual Writers’ Choice Award for Best CD in 2006 from Positive Feedback Online, and a second CD of the music of George Antheil for New World Records also received positive reviews from the world press. PVCO’s most recent recording features world premiere’s of several works by American composer Jeffrey Jacob.

References
 Philadelphia Virtuosi Chamber Orchestra

Listening
Art of the States: Philadelphia Virtuosi Chamber Orchestra

Musical groups established in 1991
Culture of Philadelphia
Musical groups from Philadelphia
Orchestras based in Pennsylvania
1991 establishments in Pennsylvania